Gabriella Guimarães de Souza, nicknames Gabi or Gabiru, (born 14 December 1993) is a Brazilian female volleyball player. With her former club Osasco/Molico she competed at the 2014 FIVB Volleyball Women's Club World Championship.
She competed with the Brazil women's national volleyball team, at the 2016 Montreux Volley Masters, 2017 FIVB Volleyball World Grand Prix, and 2018 FIVB Volleyball Women's Nations League. Her club in 2019 is Sesc RJ.

Clubs 

  Niterói Vôlei (2004–2007)
  Fluminense FC (2007–2009)
  Macaé Sports (2009–2011)
  SESI São Paulo (2011–2012)
  Nestlé Osasco (2012–2017)
  SESC-RJ (2017–)

Awards

Individuals
 2010 U20 South American Championship – "Most Valuable Player"
 2014 U22 South American Championship – "Best Outside Spiker"

Clubs
 2012–13 Brazilian Superliga –  Runner-up, with Sollys Nestlé
 2014–15 Brazilian Superliga –  Runner-up, with Molico/Osasco
 2016–17 Brazilian Superliga –  Runner-up, with Molico/Osasco
 2017–18 Brazilian Superliga –  Runner-up, with Rexona-SESC
 2012 South American Club Championship –  Champion, with Sollys Nestlé
 2014 South American Club Championship –  Runner-up, with Molico/Osasco
 2015 South American Club Championship –  Runner-up, with Molico/Osasco
 2018 South American Club Championship –  Runner-up, with Rexona-SESC
 2012 FIVB Club World Championship –  Champion, with Sollys Nestlé
 2014 FIVB Club World Championship –  Runner-up, with Molico/Osasco

External links
 profile at FIVB.org

References

1993 births
Living people
Brazilian women's volleyball players
Place of birth missing (living people)
Liberos
Sportspeople from Niterói